Fuli Town is an urban town in Liling City, Zhuzhou City, Hunan Province, People's Republic of China.

Cityscape
The town is divided into 10 villages and 1 community, the following areas: Haitang Community, Cheshang Village, Changqing Village, Tangfang Village, Haubu Village, Moshi Village, Shuangjiang Village, Fuli Village, Liqun Village, Hetian Village, and Baida Village.

References

Historic township-level divisions of Liling